Sofia Asoumanaki (born 25 May 1997) is a Greek rower. She was born in Athens, Greece and was involved in swimming between the ages of 2.5 until 16. During that time she competed many times on the national level. At the age of 16 she decided to engage herself in rowing. Within her first year in this sport she achieved fourth place in the World Junior Championship, but also received distinctions and medals in National, Balkan, European and World Championships and in September 2015 she was admitted for participation in the 2016 Olympic Games in Rio de Janeiro. Sofia Asoumanaki is a Greek rower who represented Greece, along with Katerina Nikolaidou at the 2016 Summer Olympics in Rio de Janeiro (Double sculls), finishing in the 4th place. She also won a silver medal in the double sculls at the 2015 World Rowing Championships and the same year won a silver medal in the single sculls at the 2015 Junior World Rowing Championship. Moreover, Sofia Asoumanaki holds the World Indoor Rowing Record in Boston from 2015. After the 2016 Summer Olympics she decided to follow the studies in the University Of Washington in Seattle.

References

External links
 
 
 

1997 births
Living people
Greek female rowers
World Rowing Championships medalists for Greece
Rowers at the 2016 Summer Olympics
Olympic rowers of Greece
Sportspeople from Rethymno
Rowers from Athens